The 1954 Chicago Cardinals season was the 35th season the team was in the league. The team improved on their previous season of 1–10–1, winning two games. They failed to qualify for the playoffs for the sixth consecutive season.
The Cardinals became the first NFL team in history to concede 30 or more points in each of its first five games in a season.

Schedule

Standings

References 

Arizona Cardinals seasons
Chicago Cardinals
Chicago Card